A Dog's Will (literally "The Compassionate Woman's Play", the woman being the Virgin Mary) is a 2000 Brazilian fantasy comedy film directed by Guel Arraes, who co-wrote the screenplay with Adriana Falcão and João Falcão. It is based on a similarly named play by Ariano Suassuna, with elements of some other of Suassuna's plays, The Ghost and the Sow and Torture of a Heart.

A sequel is confirmed for 2024 and features the return of Matheus Nachtergaele and Selton Mello in the roles of João Grilo and Chicó, respectively.

Plot
João Grilo (Matheus Nachtergaele) and Chicó (Selton Mello) are two poor men living in an arid, desert-like region of North-East Brazil in the 1930s. João is constantly hungry and malnourished, relying on his charm and silver tongue to fool the townsfolk for his own gain. Chicó is a handsome but cowardly man who tells outlandish stories about his past.

Upon arriving in Taperoá, the two look for work from the town's baker. The baker's wife, Dora, dotes on her dog, who is fed luxurious food. When João and Chicó steal the dog's food, it accidentally eats theirs and quickly falls ill. Desperate for help, Dora begs the duo to have the priest to bless her dog. João first attempts to convince the priest to bless the dog by saying it is owned by Major Antônio Morais, a wealthy landowner in the area, and later has the priest perform funeral rites for the dog by saying it left the church money in its will. The Bishop, initially infuriated at the priest for this, walks back immediately once he learns he is able to take some of the money.

Dora seduces Chicó and attempts to sleep with him before being visited by her other suitor, the town bully Vicentão, and then her husband. João takes a job assisting Major Antônio Morais and his daughter Rosinha, who is in town seeking a blessing from the priest. Vicentão and Corporal Setenta are smitten with Rosinha, but she immediately falls in love with Chicó. Morais wants to marry off Rosinha to a rich man and promises a dowry of a piggy bank filled with coins as left by her grandmother. João devises a plan to pit Vicentão and Corporal Setenta against each other which leaves Chicó the last suitor standing. Dressed up as a wealthy and educated man, Chicó asks for Rosinha's hand in marriage from Morais but Chicó talks him into paying 200 crowns to the priest for church renovations. Morais decides to pay for the renovations on Chicó's behalf, but he requests the “skin off his back” in the case that Chicó should fail to pay him back.

Unable to pay the debt, the duo make a plan to fake Chicó's death with a blood filled balloon with João riding into town pretending to be a bandit. On the day, actual bandits, led by the ferocious Severino, raid the town and begin looting and killing. Severino rounds up the baker and his wife, the two church leaders, and João and Chicó, planning to shoot them all outside of the church. João decides to trick Severino into believing that his harmonica was blessed and now brings people back to life. To  convince Severino, he stabs Chicó in the blood-filled balloon and Chicó plays dead and then “resurrects” after João plays the instrument. Severino agrees to be shot and is killed, but João is shot himself while trying to run away from the scene.

Arriving in the afterlife, the six dead members are all placed under trial by the Devil (Luís Melo). He is joined by Jesus Christ, who oversees the trial. João begs for the Virgin Mary's help and she arrives to convince Jesus to be forgiving. Before being executed, the baker forgave his wife for her adultery and the two church leaders forgave those who shot them - enough for them to land in purgatory instead of hell. Severino is absolved as his bandit ways started when police members killed his family as a child. The Devil attempts to take João but he is granted a second chance at life having been a poor but hopeful man his entire life.

Upon reviving, the duo donate all the money taken from the dead townsfolk in the name of the Virgin Mary. Chicó and Rosinha get married, attempting to use the dowry to pay off his debt, but it ends up being filled with worthless coins. Using a technicality (that the skin off his back should not come with a drop of blood), they manage to evade their debt. All three now penniless, they find bump into Jesus Christ posing as a hungry man on the road and share their bread with him.

Cast

 Matheus Nachtergaele as João Grilo (Jack the Cricket)
 Selton Mello as Chicó
 Fernanda Montenegro as Virgin Mary
 Marco Nanini as Cangaceiro Severino de Aracaju
 Denise Fraga as Dora
 Lima Duarte as Bishop
 Rogério Cardoso as priest João
 Diogo Vilela as Eurico
 Maurício Gonçalves as Jesus Christ
 Virginia Cavendish as Rosinha
 Paulo Goulart as Major Antônio Morais
 Luís Melo as the Devil
 Bruno Garcia as Vicentão
 Enrique Diaz as Severino's henchman
 Aramis Trindade as Corporal Setenta

Reception
The film was a critical and commercial success in Brazil—receiving four awards at the 2nd Grande Prêmio Cinema Brasil and grossing R$11,496,994 ($4,903,192) with a 2,157,166 viewership—,and in some South American countries like Chile and Venezuela. On review aggregator website Rotten Tomatoes, the film has an approval rating of 94% from audiences.

See also 
 Our Lady of Aparecida
 Lisbela e o Prisioneiro

Notes

References

External links
 
 

2000 comedy films
2000 films
Brazilian comedy films
Films about religion
Brazilian films based on plays
Films directed by Guel Arraes
The Devil in film
2000s Portuguese-language films